Kenji Osawa   (born November 4, 1976) is a retired Japanese mixed martial artist from Tokyo. He debuted in MMA over a decade ago, and trains and fights out of Wajitsu Keishukai, where he teaches once a week.

MMA career
Osawa's fight record is 21-11-2 and has competed in many of the top organisations such as Shooto, WEC, DREAM and DEEP.

He was scheduled to fight Brazilian jiu-jitsu ace Rani Yahya on August 9, 2009 at WEC 42, but due to a foot injury, he was replaced by John Hosman.

Osawa lost via unanimous decision to Antonio Banuelos on November 18, 2009 at WEC 44 and was subsequently released from the promotion.

Osawa made his DREAM debut against Yoshiro Maeda at DREAM.14 on May 29, 2010 winning a close split decision.

On April 29, 2014 Osawa retired after losing a rematch to Takafumi Otsuka, a fighter Osawa had previously beaten in 2011.

Career titles
 Amateur Shooto '02 East Japan Title
 Amateur Shooto '02 All Japan Title

Mixed martial arts record

|-
| Loss
| align=center| 20–11–2
| Takafumi Otsuka
| Decision (unanimous)
| Deep: 66 Impact
| 
| align=center| 3
| align=center| 5:00
| Tokyo, Japan
| 
|-
| Win
| align=center| 20–10–2
| Seiji Akao
| Decision (split)
| Deep: Tribe Tokyo Fight
| 
| align=center| 3
| align=center| 5:00
| Tokyo, Japan
| 
|-
| Win
| align=center| 19–10–2
| Takeshi Inoue
| Decision (unanimous)
| Vale Tudo Japan: VTJ 1st
| 
| align=center| 3
| align=center| 5:00
| Tokyo, Japan
| 
|-
| Win
| align=center| 18–10–2
| Keisuke Fujiwara
| Decision (unanimous)
| Dream: Japan GP Final
| 
| align=center| 2
| align=center| 5:00
| Tokyo, Japan
| DREAM Bantamweight Grand Prix Third Place bout
|-
| Loss
| align=center| 17–10–2
| Masakazu Imanari
| Submission (achilles lock)
| Dream: Fight for Japan!
| 
| align=center| 2
| align=center| 0:58
| Saitama, Saitama, Japan
| DREAM Bantamweight Grand Prix Semifinal
|-
| Win
| align=center| 17–9–2
| Takafumi Otsuka
| Decision (split)
| Dream: Fight for Japan!
| 
| align=center| 2
| align=center| 5:00
| Saitama, Saitama, Japan
| DREAM Bantamweight Grand Prix Quarterfinal
|-
| Win
| align=center| 16–9–2
| Yoshiro Maeda
| Decision (split)
| Dream 14
| 
| align=center| 3
| align=center| 5:00
| Saitama, Saitama, Japan
| 
|-
| Loss
| align=center| 15–9–2
| Antonio Banuelos
| Decision (unanimous)
| WEC 44
| 
| align=center| 3
| align=center| 5:00
| Las Vegas, Nevada, United States
| 
|-
| Win
| align=center| 15–8–2
| Rafael Rebello
| Decision (split)
| WEC 39
| 
| align=center| 3
| align=center| 5:00
| Corpus Christi, Texas, United States
| 
|-
| Win
| align=center| 14–8–2
| Tomoya Miyashita
| Decision (unanimous)
| GCM: Cage Force EX Eastern Bound
| 
| align=center| 3
| align=center| 5:00
| Tokyo, Japan
| 
|-
| Loss
| align=center| 13–8–2
| Scott Jorgensen
| Decision (unanimous)
| WEC 35: Condit vs. Miura
| 
| align=center| 3
| align=center| 5:00
| Las Vegas, Nevada, United States
| 
|-
| Draw
| align=center| 13–7–2
| Chris Manuel
| Draw
| WEC 33: Marshall vs. Stann
| 
| align=center| 3
| align=center| 5:00
| Las Vegas, Nevada, United States
| 
|-
| Win
| align=center| 13–7–1
| Nobuhiro Yamauchi
| Decision (unanimous)
| Cage Force 5
| 
| align=center| 2
| align=center| 5:00
| Tokyo, Japan
| 
|-
| Loss
| align=center| 12–7–1
| Daniel Lima
| Decision (split)
| Shooto: Back To Our Roots 5
| 
| align=center| 3
| align=center| 5:00
| Tokyo, Japan
| 
|-
| Loss
| align=center| 12–6–1
| Marcos Galvão
| Decision (majority)
| Shooto: Back To Our Roots 3
| 
| align=center| 3
| align=center| 5:00
| Tokyo, Japan
| 
|-
| Win
| align=center| 12–5–1
| Takeya Mizugaki
| TKO (punches and knees)
| Shooto: 11/10 in Korakuen Hall
| 
| align=center| 2
| align=center| 0:59
| Tokyo, Japan
| 
|-
| Loss
| align=center| 11–5–1
| Akitoshi Hokazono
| Decision (unanimous)
| Shooto 2006: 7/21 in Korakuen Hall
| 
| align=center| 3
| align=center| 5:00
| Tokyo, Japan
| 
|-
| Win
| align=center| 11–4–1
| Naoya Uematsu
| Decision (majority)
| Shooto: The Victory of the Truth
| 
| align=center| 3
| align=center| 5:00
| Tokyo, Japan
| 
|-
| Loss
| align=center| 10–4–1
| Daiki Hata
| Decision (unanimous)
| GCM: D.O.G. 4
| 
| align=center| 2
| align=center| 5:00
| Tokyo, Japan
| 
|-
| Draw
| align=center| 10–3–1
| Daniel Lima
| Draw
| Shooto 2005: 11/6 in Korakuen Hall
| 
| align=center| 3
| align=center| 5:00
| Tokyo, Japan
| 
|-
| Win
| align=center| 10–3
| Jin Akimoto
| Decision (majority)
| Shooto: 5/4 in Korakuen Hall
| 
| align=center| 2
| align=center| 5:00
| Tokyo, Japan
| 
|-
| Win
| align=center| 9–3
| Minoru Tsuiki
| KO (knees)
| GCM: D.O.G. 1
| 
| align=center| 3
| align=center| 0:22
| Tokyo, Japan
| 
|-
| Win
| align=center| 8–3
| Seiji Otsuka
| Decision (unanimous)
| Shooto: Wanna Shooto 2004
| 
| align=center| 2
| align=center| 5:00
| Tokyo, Japan
| 
|-
| Win
| align=center| 7–3
| Hiroshi Umemura
| Decision (unanimous)
| Shooto: Gig Central 6
| 
| align=center| 3
| align=center| 5:00
| Nagoya, Japan
| 
|-
| Loss
| align=center| 6–3
| So Tazawa
| TKO (cut)
| Shooto 2004: 7/4 in Kitazawa Town Hall 	
| 
| align=center| 1
| align=center| 2:33
| Tokyo, Japan
| 
|-
| Loss
| align=center| 6–2
| Akitoshi Hokazono
| Submission (rear-naked choke)
| Shooto 2004: 4/16 in Kitazawa Town Hall
| 
| align=center| 1
| align=center| 1:50
| Tokyo, Japan
| 
|-
| Win
| align=center| 6–1
| Tetsuya Nishi
| TKO (punches)
| GCM: Demolition Atom 6
| 
| align=center| 1
| align=center| 4:45
| Tokyo, Japan
| 
|-
| Win
| align=center| 5–1
| Hiroyuki Tanaka
| Decision (unanimous)
| Shooto 2004: 1/24 in Korakuen Hall
| 
| align=center| 2
| align=center| 5:00
| Tokyo, Japan
| 
|-
| Win
| align=center| 4–1
| Augusto Frota
| Submission (arm-triangle choke)
| Shooto: Wanna Shooto 2003
| 
| align=center| 2
| align=center| 4:24
| Tokyo, Japan
| 
|-
| Loss
| align=center| 3–1
| Yohei Mikami
| Decision (unanimous)
| Shooto: 9/5 in Korakuen Hall
| 
| align=center| 2
| align=center| 5:00
| Tokyo, Japan
| 
|-
| Win
| align=center| 3–0
| Atsunori Hiruma
| Decision (unanimous)
| GCM: Demolition 8
| 
| align=center| 2
| align=center| 5:00
| Tokyo, Japan
| 
|-
| Win
| align=center| 2–0
| Manabu Kano
| Submission (rear-naked choke)
| Shooto: 3/18 in Korakuen Hall
| 
| align=center| 2
| align=center| 3:21
| Yokohama, Japan
| 
|-
| Win
| align=center| 1–0
| Koki Sato
| TKO (knees)
| GCM: Demolition 030209
| 
| align=center| 2
| align=center| 1:46
| Yokohama, Japan
|

References

External links
 
 
 Official Keishukai Myspace page

People from Musashimurayama, Tokyo
Sportspeople from Tokyo Metropolis
Japanese male mixed martial artists
Bantamweight mixed martial artists
Mixed martial artists utilizing boxing
Mixed martial artists utilizing Brazilian jiu-jitsu
Japanese practitioners of Brazilian jiu-jitsu
Wajitsu Keishukai
1976 births
Living people